EAX may refer to:

 EAX mode, a mode of operation for cryptographic block ciphers
 EAX register, a 32-bit processor register of x86 CPUs
 Environmental Audio Extensions, a number of digital signal processing presets for audio, found in Sound Blaster sound cards
 GTD-5 EAX, class 5 digital telephone switch typically used in former GTE service areas